Country Gentlemen is a 1936 American comedy film directed by Ralph Staub for Republic Pictures with the comedy duo of Olsen and Johnson.

Plot summary 
Two swindlers, their Gracie Allen type secretary and her Great Dane named Fluffy are on the run and end up in the small town of Chesterville.  Though Ole wishes to give up the dishonest life and settle in the small town with hotel owner Louise and her son, they sense the smell of money when a Veteran's Home is built in the town and they can swindle the ex-soldiers of their bonuses.  Things expand with a scheme in selling shares in an oil exploration project.

Cast 
Ole Olsen as J.D. McAllister, aka Jerome D. Hamilton
Chic Johnson as Charles Watson, aka Charlie "Chubby" Williams
Joyce Compton as Gertie
Lila Lee as Mrs. Louise Heath
Pierre Watkin as Mr. Grayson
Donald Kirke as Mr. Martin
Ray Corrigan as Briggs
Sammy McKim as Billy Heath
Wade Boteler as First Deputy
Ivan Miller as Harry, Second Deputy
Olin Howland as Lawyer
Frank Sheridan as Chief of Police
Harry Harvey as Shorty, an Investor
Joe Cunningham as Chuck, the Counterman
Prince as Fluffy (the Great Dane)

Soundtrack

External links 

1936 films
1936 comedy films
1930s English-language films
American black-and-white films
Republic Pictures films
American comedy films
Films directed by Ralph Staub
Films produced by Nat Levine
1930s American films